is an underground metro station located in Naka-ku, Nagoya, Aichi Prefecture, Japan operated by the Nagoya Municipal Subway's Tsurumai Line. It is located 7.8 rail kilometers (4.8 rail miles) from the terminus of the Tsurumai Line at Kami-Otai Station. It provides access to the Buddhist temple and tourist attraction of Ōsu Kannon.

History
Ōsu Kannon Station was opened on 18 March 1977.

Lines

 (Station number: T08)

Layout
Ōsu Kannon Station has two underground opposed side platforms.

Platforms

References

External links

 Ōsu Kannon Station official web site 
 Ōsu, a shopping area 

Railway stations in Aichi Prefecture
Railway stations in Japan opened in 1977
Ōsu